Lauren Tait (born 10 August 1996) is a Scottish netball player. She was selected to represent the Scotland netball team at the 2019 Netball World Cup.

References

External links
 

1996 births
Living people
Scottish netball players
Place of birth missing (living people)
2019 Netball World Cup players
Sirens Netball players
Netball Superleague players